Nenjangal is a 1982 Indian Tamil-language film, directed by Major Sundarrajan and produced by Vijayakumar. The film stars Sivaji Ganesan, Lakshmi, Manjula and Vijayakumar. It was released on 10 December 1982.

Plot

Cast 
Sivaji Ganesan
Lakshmi
Manjula
Vijayakumar
Jyothi
Baby Meena
Major Sundarrajan
Thengai Srinivasan
Thiagarajan

Production 
When Vijayakumar was in search of a child actress to portray Ganesan's daughter, he found Meena and approached her mother to let her daughter act in the film to which she agreed.

Soundtrack 
The soundtrack was composed by Shankar–Ganesh and lyrics of the songs were penned by Vaali.

Reception 
Thiraignani of Kalki felt it is carelessness on the part of the director to trivialise the story which should have been taken seriously.

References

External links 

1980s Tamil-language films
1982 films
Films directed by Major Sundarrajan
Films scored by Shankar–Ganesh